Who's Better, Who's Best is a collection of videos by The Who released in 1988 as the companion to the compilation album of the same name.

Songs performed
1.  "My Generation"
Broadcast on Beat-Club
Recorded at the Marquee Club on 2 March 1967
2.  "I Can't Explain"
Original promo video
Recorded at various London locales in 1964 and 1965
3.  "Anyway, Anyhow, Anywhere"
Consists of 8mm concert films shot by Jon Rubin
Recorded at various New York City locales in 1967 and 1968
4.  "Substitute"
Original promo video
Recorded in Covent Garden on 21 March 1966
5.  "The Kids Are Alright"
Original promo video
Recorded in Hyde Park in July or August 1966
6.  "I'm a Boy"
Broadcast on Beat-Club
Recorded in Planten un Blomen on 15 January 1967
7.  "Happy Jack"
Original promo video
Recorded at the offices of New Action Ltd. (The Who's management company) on 19 December 1966
8.  "Pictures of Lily"
Broadcast on Beat-Club
Recorded at Bremen Fern-Studio on 1 April 1967
9.  "Magic Bus"
Tram bus footage recorded in October 1968
Concert footage recorded in Voorburg, the Netherlands on 10 March 1973
10.  "You Better You Bet"
Original promo video
Recorded at Shepperton Studios in March 1981
11.  "I Can See For Miles"
Broadcast on The Smothers Brothers Comedy Hour
Recorded at various locations in 1967
12.  "Pinball Wizard"
Excerpt from Woodstock film
Recorded at the Woodstock Music and Art Fair on 17 August 1969
13.  "I'm Free"
Concert footage directed by Chris Stamp
Recorded at the London Coliseum on 14 December 1969
14.  "See Me, Feel Me"
Excerpt from Woodstock film
Recorded at the Woodstock Music and Art Fair on 17 August 1969
15.  "Join Together"
Original promo video
Recorded at The London Studios on 25 June 1972
16.  "Who Are You"
Excerpt from The Kids Are Alright film
Recorded at Ramport Studios on 4 May 1978
17.  "Won't Get Fooled Again"
Excerpt from The Kids Are Alright film
Recorded at Shepperton Studios on 25 May 1978

Special features
1.  "Don't Let Go the Coat"
Original promo video
Recorded at Shepperton Studios in March 1981
2.  "Another Tricky Day"
Original promo video
Recorded at Shepperton Studios in March 1981
3.  "Eminence Front"
Original promo video
Recorded at the Capital Centre in September 1982

These bonus clips are only on the DVD version released a few years later.

Certifications

References

The Who video albums